Jennifer Ann Prescher is an American chemist who is a professor of chemistry at the University of California, Irvine. Her research considers the development of bioorthogonal, bioluminescent tools for the noninvasive, real-time imaging of immunometabolism. She was recognized with the 2023 American Chemical Society Arthur C. Cope Scholar Award.

Early life and education
Prescher was an undergraduate in chemistry at the University of Wisconsin–La Crosse. She moved to California as a doctoral researcher, and was appointed to the University of California, Berkeley as a Howard Hughes Medical Institute predoctoral fellow, where she worked with Carolyn Bertozzi on glycosylation. She developed a strategy to visualize the glycosylation process, which allowed for the design and development of novel diagnostics. The strategy relied upon the use of bioorthogonal chemistries. Specifically, she showed that it was possible to incorporate metabolic precursor sugars with specific chemical functionalities into target glycans. For example, biologically inert azides can be incorporated into glycans and chemically modified with exogenously delivered probes.

Research and career 
In 2008, she joined Stanford University as a Susan Komen postdoctoral fellow. Prescher joined the University of California, Irvine in 2010, and was made a full professor in 2018. Her early work looked to design imaging techniques to better understand cell movements and metastatic disease. She worked on bioluminescent tools; tools which luminesce when they come into close proximity to cancer cells. She called the technique a biological flashlight, or phasor.

Awards and honors 
 2014 Kavli Fellow
 2014 National Science Foundation CAREER Award
 2015 Sloan Research Fellowship
 2015 Novartis early career award in organic chemistry
 2016 Thieme Medical Publishers chemistry journal award
 2016 American Chemical Society Women in Chemistry Rising Star
 2016 University of California, Irvine distinguished assistant professor award for research
 2018 Scialog Fellow
 2021 Paul Allen Distinguished Investigator
 2023 American Chemical Society Arthur C. Cope Scholar Award

Selected publications 
 A Comparative Study of Bioorthogonal Reactions with Azides
 A strain-promoted [3 + 2] azide-alkyne cycloaddition for covalent modification of biomolecules in living systems
 Chemistry in living systems

References 

Year of birth missing (living people)
Living people
21st-century American women scientists
21st-century American chemists
University of California, Irvine faculty
University of Wisconsin–La Crosse alumni
University of California, Berkeley alumni